Helmut Podolan (born 31 August 1955) is an Austrian former swimmer. He competed at the men's 100 metre backstroke and men's 200 metre backstroke events at the 1972 Summer Olympics.

References

External links
 

1955 births
Living people
Austrian male backstroke swimmers
Olympic swimmers of Austria
Swimmers at the 1972 Summer Olympics
Place of birth missing (living people)